Joseph McLeod (born 30 December 1967 in Edinburgh) is a Scottish former footballer who played as a left midfielder.

Career
McLeod came through the youth ranks at Dundee United but managed only seventeen appearances in a four-year spell, which included a loan period with Dumbarton. In 1990, McLeod moved to Motherwell, managing nearly fifty league appearances over a three-year period. In 1993, McLeod had a brief spell in Northern Ireland with Portadown before moving back to Scotland in December 1993 with Stirling Albion. In 1998, McLeod moved to Berwick Rangers where he finished his playing career in November.

As a youth, McLeod was a runner-up in the Under-18 European Championship with Scotland in 1986.

McLeod is now a maintenance operative with Scottish Water in Edinburgh.

Honours
 Under-18 European Championship runner-up: 1
 1986

References

External links 
 
 

1967 births
Living people
Footballers from Edinburgh
Scottish footballers
Dundee United F.C. players
Dumbarton F.C. players
Motherwell F.C. players
Portadown F.C. players
Stirling Albion F.C. players
Berwick Rangers F.C. players
Scottish Football League players
Scotland under-21 international footballers
Scotland youth international footballers
Association football midfielders